The Raigam Tele'es Channel of the Year Award is presented annually in Sri Lanka by the Kingdom of Raigam associated with many commercial brands for the best Sri Lankan television channel of the year in television screen, who received most awards at the ceremony.

The award was first given in 2009. Following is a list of the winners of this award since then.

Award list in each year

References

Raigam Tele'es